National Route 13 is a national highway in South Korea connects Wando County to Geumsan County. It established on 31 August 1971.

Main stopovers
 South Jeolla Province
 Wando County - Haenam County - Gangjin County - Yeongam County - Naju 
 Gwangju
 Gwangsan District - Buk District
 South Jeolla Province
 Damyang County - Gokseong County
 North Jeolla Province
 Namwon - Sunchang County - Imsil County - Jangsu County - Jinan County
 South Chungcheong Province
 Geumsan County

Major intersections

 (■): Motorway
IS: Intersection, IC: Interchange

South Jeolla Province (South Gwangju)

Gwangju

South Jeolla Province (North Gwangju)

North Jeolla Province

South Chungcheong Province

References

13
Roads in South Jeolla
Roads in Gwangju
Roads in North Chungcheong
Roads in North Jeolla